Diphu Medical College and Hospital is a medical college with attached hospital located in Diphu, Assam. It started functioning from 25 November 2019. This is the 7th medical college of the state. The college operates under the State Ministry of Health and Family Welfare, Assam. It is recognised by Medical Council of India and affiliated with Srimanta Sankaradeva University of Health Sciences, Guwahati.

History
The construction was initiated by laying the foundation stone by Himanta Biswa Sarma on 19 January 2011. In 2017, the existing work of the college was enhanced from 156.55 to 209 Crores Indian rupee. The construction began from 2012, but the final plan for the college was received on 28 April 2018, as the architectural design was revised three times.

Brahmaputra Infrastructures was involved in the construction of Assam Hills Medical College and Research Institute. On 21 November 2019, Assam Hills Medical College and Research Institute (AHMC&RI) was renamed to Diphu Medical College and Hospital in the interest of the general public.

College
The college has facilities like hostel accommodation of 204 seats (102 rooms) each for Boys, Girls and Nursing staff, a modern library and an air-conditioned Lecture hall. Currently the college has an intact capacity of 100 undergraduate students, from academic year 2020–21.

Hospital
The hospital currently has 300 beds. 24x7 hours emergency services including ambulance. COVID-19 testing and diagnosis facility, Intensive Care Unit, Operating theater, Blood bank, Radiology like X-ray & Ultrasonography, Medical laboratory, Pharmacy etc. along with a modern kitchen.

The hospital has Out-Patient Department (OPD) from 8AM to 2PM, Monday to Saturday. Visiting time for patients is from 4PM-6PM (Evening).

Gallery

See also
Education in India
Literacy in India
List of institutions of higher education in Assam

References

External links 
 hfw.assam.gov

Affiliates of Srimanta Sankaradeva University of Health Sciences
Medical colleges in Assam
Hospitals in Assam
Educational institutions established in 2019
2019 establishments in Assam